The Democratic Party of Emilia-Romagna (PDER) is a social-democratic political party in Italy, acting as the regional faction of the Democratic Party. The PD is the largest party by representation in Emilia-Romagna and it led a coalition formed by Left Ecology Freedom and Italy of Values which had a supermajority in the regional Legislative Assembly. The party's leader was Vasco Errani, who was President of Emilia-Romagna until 14 July 2014.

The Democratic Party is the heir of the Italian Communist Party which governed Emilia-Romagna for almost sixty years; in fact, Emilia-Romagna is considered by public opinion a "red region", or rather a region which has been governed only by centre-left or left-wing Presidents, and where social-democratic, socialist and communist parties gained the majority of votes in every elections.

Other than Vasco Errani prominent members of the PDER include Virginio Merola, Graziano Delrio and Stefano Bonaccini.

Popular support
The electoral results of the Democratic Party in the Emilia-Romagna are shown in the table below. As PD was founded in 2007, the electoral results from 1994 to 2006 refer to the combined result of the two main percursor parties, the Democrats of the Left and Democracy is Freedom – The Daisy (and its precursors, 1994–2001), or to the joint-list called The Olive Tree.

Electoral results

References

Democratic Party (Italy)
Political parties in Emilia-Romagna